Jenny Galloway is a British actress, and singer best known for her stage career which includes Madame Thénardier in Les Misérables.

She has received numerous awards and nominations, winning the 1999 Olivier Award for Best Supporting Actress in a Musical for her performance in Mamma Mia!. She had previously won the award seven years earlier for her portrayal of the character Luce in George Abbott's The Boys from Syracuse.

Galloway can be heard on the cast recordings of Les Misérables 10th Anniversary Concert, Les Misérables 25th Anniversary Concert, Oliver!, Mamma Mia! and Mary Poppins.

In the 2001 ITV children's TV series Weirdsister College (a sequel to The Worst Witch which follows the adventures of schoolgirl witch Mildred Hubble into further education), Jenny Galloway portrayed the college porter known as the Beetle. The Beetle was strict, widely disliked and a stickler for the rules to the point where she actually seemed to enjoy evicting people to save money!

Film credits include In Transit, About a Boy, Fierce Creatures and the role of the Foreign Secretary in Johnny English. She appeared in Madame de Sade alongside Judi Dench and Deborah Findlay as Charlotte in 2008.

Galloway had a principal role in the fifth series episode of Marple The Pale Horse alongside Julia McKenzie. Her role was Bella Ellis – the town's local witch and cook to Thyrza Grey, (played by Pauline Collins) – who are considered prime suspects at many points during the episode. The episode aired as the first part of the fifth series in the UK in August 2010, for some reason before the fourth series had finished airing.

She reprised her role as Madame Thénardier in the 2010 25th anniversary concert of Les Misérables at the O2 arena, London in October 2010. This concert is now available on DVD and Blu-ray. She was briefly reunited with her former co-star Alun Armstrong at the end of the performance when he appeared alongside the rest of the original cast of the musical for the finale. She and Armstrong had appeared as the Thénardiers in the 10th Anniversary Concert at the Royal Albert Hall. Galloway also played the character in 2006 Broadway Revival of the show.

Galloway worked at the Watermill Theatre, Newbury, Berkshire in 1982, returning periodically, to assist stage management, drive the van, and lead sing-alongs.

In 2013, she appeared as Sister Thomas in the Father Brown episode "The Bride of Christ". In 2017, she featured as the Nanny in the film adaptation of Agatha Christie's Crooked House alongside Glenn Close, Max Irons and Terence Stamp.

Theatre credits
 Sandra – Zigger Zagger (1967) – National Youth Theatre
 Madame Thénardier – Les Misérables (1992–1994, 1995, 2006–2008 and 2010)
 Widow Corney – Oliver! (1994; revival cast)
 Rosie – Mamma Mia! (1999; original cast)
 Mickey - My One and Only 2002; Original West End Cast
 Mrs. Lovett – Sweeney Todd: The Demon Barber of Fleet Street
 Mrs. Brill – Mary Poppins (2004; original cast, 2009)
 Mrs. Pearce – My Fair Lady (Paris Production 2010)

Selected filmography
 Come Away (2020)
 Johnny English (2003)
 The Clandestine Marriage (1999)

References

External links

Year of birth missing (living people)
Place of birth missing (living people)
British film actresses
British musical theatre actresses
Living people
British television actresses
British women singers
Laurence Olivier Award winners
British stage actresses